Okrog pri Motniku is a small settlement in the Municipality of Kamnik in the Upper Carniola region of Slovenia.

Name
In 1952, the three former villages of Peteržilje, Spodnji Okrog, and Zgornji Okrog were combined into a single village named Spodnji Okrog. In 1955, the name of the settlement was changed from Spodnji Okrog to Okrog pri Motniku.

Notable people
Notable people that were born in Okrog pri Motniku include:
Andrej Volkar (1847–1930), lawyer

References

External links

Okrog pri Motniku on Geopedia

Populated places in the Municipality of Kamnik